I (Almost) Got Away with It is an American documentary television series on Investigation Discovery, debuting on January 12, 2010. The series profiles true stories of people who have committed crimes, and have avoided arrest or capture, but ultimately end up being caught. The series was created by executive producer David M. Frank of Indigo Films.

Episodes

Season 1

Season 2

Season 3

Season 4

Season 5

Season 6

Season 7

Season 8

References

External links

2010s American documentary television series
2010 American television series debuts
2016 American television series endings
Investigation Discovery original programming